Dortmund (Quartet) 1976 is a live album by American composer and saxophonist Anthony Braxton recorded in Germany in 1976 but not released on the hatART label until 1991. The album was subsequently reissued as Quartet (Dortmund) 1976 in 2001 and in 2019 (3rd edition).

Reception
The Allmusic review by Steve Loewy awarded the album 5 stars stating "Braxton has produced many excellent recordings through the years, but only a small number stand out from the pack the way this one does... difficult but highly rewarding music".

Track listing
All compositions by Anthony Braxton.

 "Composition 40 F/Composition 23 J" - 26:10 
 "Composition 40 (O)" - 6:40 
 "Composition 6 C" - 9:47 
 "Composition 40 B" - 13:57 
Recorded at Jazzlife in Dortmund, Germany on October 31, 1976

Personnel
Anthony Braxton - sopranino saxophone, alto saxophone, contrabass saxophone, clarinet, E-flat clarinet, contrabass clarinet
George Lewis - trombone
Dave Holland - bass
Barry Altschul - drums, percussion

References

Hathut Records live albums
Anthony Braxton live albums
1991 albums